Gubernatorial elections were held in Mexico on June 6, 2021. Governors were to be elected in the states of Baja California, Baja California Sur, Chihuahua, Colima, Guerrero, Michoacán, Nayarit, Nuevo León, Sinaloa, Sonora, Campeche, Querétaro, San Luis Potosí, Tlaxcala, and Zacatecas. The formal period of campaigning is from March 5 to June 2, 2021.

On December 5, 2020, and  announced an electoral alliance, Va por México ("Go For Mexico"). INE approved the Va por México alliance and the Juntos hacemos historia (″Together we make history″) alliance.

The Instituto Nacional Electoral (National Electoral Institute, INE) issued a statement on February 3, 2021, saying that it would not be prudent to postpone the election because of the COVID-19 pandemic and doing so could even trigger a constitutional crisis by delaying the opening of the 65th Congress. INE board president Lorenzo Córdova noted the successful elections in Hidalgo and Coahuila in October 2020.

Race summary

States

Baja California
Governor of Baja California – incumbent Jaime Bonilla Valdez 
Marina del Pilar Ávila Olmeda – Juntos Haremos Historia currently municipal president of Mexicali
Jorge Hank Rhon - (Solidarity Encounter Party PES), racetrack and casino owner, former municipal president of Tijuana.
Lupita Jones – va por BC, former beauty queen (Miss Universe 1991)
Alcibíades García Lizardi(), Current deputy and former senator
Carlos Atilano Peña (Baja California Party PBC)
Jorge Ojeda García businessman
Victoria bentley duarte former state deputy

Marina del Pilar Ávila Olmeda (Juntos Haremos Historia) was declared the winner with 48.1% of the vote.

Baja California Sur
Governor of Baja California Sur – incumbent Carlos Mendoza Davis 

Francisco Pelayo Cobarruvias - UNIDOS CONTIGO )( - PH - PRS)

Víctor Manuel Castro Cosío was declared the winner with 46.45% of the vote.

Campeche
Governor of Campeche – incumbent (substitute) Carlos Miguel Aysa González 

Layda Elena Sansores was declared the winner with 32.8%. Eliseo Fernandez had 32.4%, and Christian Castro had 30.9%.

Chihuahua
Governor of Chihuahua – incumbent Javier Corral Jurado 
María Eugenia Campos Galván , first female mayor of Chihuahua (2016-present); federal deputy (2006-2009). On March 28 she was forced to surrender her passport and pay a MXN $500,000 bond for accusations of bribery related to accusations against former governor César Duarte Jáquez.
Jaime Beltrán del Río Beltrán del Río – 
Cruz Pérez Cuéllar – , currently a federal deputy
Francisco Javier Félix Muñoz – 
José Luis Barraza González – Independent
Juan Carlos Loera

María Eugenia Campos Galván was declared the winnerwith 44.3% of the vote.

Colima
Governor of Colima – incumbent José Ignacio Peralta 

Virgilio Mendoza – , former mayor of Manzanillo
Leoncio Morán Sánchez – , federal deputy 2009-2012
Joel Padilla Peña – , currently federal deputy
Mely Romero Celis – , former Senator (2012-2015)
Indira Vizcaíno Silva – , former federal deputy (2009-2012)
Claudia Yáñez – , federal deputy for 

The candidates formally began their campaigns on Friday, March 5. 

Indira Vizcaíno Silva was declared the winner with 32.9% of the vote. Mely Romero Celis was second with 27.5%

Guerrero
Governor of Guerrero – incumbent Héctor Astudillo Flores 
Irma Garzón – 
Ambrosio Guzmán – 
Dolores Huerta – 
Manuel Negrete Arias – , former soccer player and current mayor of Coyoacán, Mexico City
Pablo Segura – 
Félix Salgado Macedonio ("El Toro") , former municipal president of Acapulco (2005-2008) INE rejected his candidacy and he was replaced by Evelyn Salgado, his daughter.
Ruth Zavaleta – , former federal deputy  and mayor of Venustiano Carranza, Mexico City

Many women, including members of Morena, demanded the party withdraw it support for Félix Salgado Macedonio after allegations of sexual abuse became public. The Comisión Nacional de Honestidad y Justicia (CNHJ) of Morena ruled that the accusations of five women were unfounded and that Salgado Macedonio could continue as the party's candidate. He was approved by the electoral commission on March 4 and reportedly was favored 3:1 over Mario Moreno Arcos in polls. Instituto Nacional Electoral (INE) disqualified Salgado Macedonio for not reporting expenses related to his Facebook page. Fifteen thousand people marched in Chilpancingo to demand that Salgado Macedonio be allowed to run.

The candidates formally began their campaigns on Friday, March 5.

Evelyn Salgado was declared the winner with 46% of the vote.

Michoacán
Governor of Michoacán – incumbent Silvano Aureoles Conejo 
He was replaced by Alfredo Ramirez Bedolla.
Carlos Herrera Tello , former mayor of Zitácuaro

Alfredo Ramirez Bedolla was declared the winner with 41.5% of the vote. Carlos Herrera Tello was second with 39%.

Nayarit
Governor of Nayarit – incumbent Antonio Echevarría García 
Miguel Ángel Navarro Quintero Juntos Haremos Historia, doctor and current senator

Miguel Ángel Navarro Quintero (Juntos Haremos Historia) won with 49.5% of the vote.

Nuevo León
Governor of Nuevo León – incumbent Jaime Rodríguez Calderón ″El Bronco″, Independent
Adrian de la Garza (Va Fuerte por Nuevo León ) 
Clara Luz Flores Juntos Haremos Historia, until December 3, 2020, municipal president of General Escobedo She is known to have close ties to condemned child pornographer and sex trafficker Keith Raniere of NXIVM.
Samuel García Sepúlveda – , federal senator Replaced by Miguel Ángel Navarro Quintero.
Carolina Garza – 
Emilio Jacques – , doctor who worked as sub-secretary of health for Nuevo Leon
Fernando Larrazábal Bretón – , former municipal president of Monterrey (2009–2012) and San Nicolás de los Garza (2000–2003)
Daney Siller – 

The candidates formally began their campaigns on Friday, March 5.

Samuel García won with 36.6% of the vote. Adrian de la Garza (Va Fuerte por Nuevo León ) was second with 27.9%. The electoral court (TEPJF) determined on June 10 that Garcia had engaged in gender violence against Clara Luz Flores Carrales, and would be sanction. He has to publish an apology and he and members of his campaign have to take a training course about gender violence.

Querétaro
Governor of Querétaro – incumbent Francisco Domínguez Servién 
Mauricio Kuri González (Querétaro Independiente and ) 
Celia Maya García , former judge She registered with Instituto Nacional Electoral (INE) on March 26, 2021.

Mauricio Kuri González (Querétaro Independiente and ) won with 54.2% of the vote.

San Luis Potosí
Governor of San Luis Potosí – incumbent Juan Manuel Carreras 
Adrián Esper – 
Ricardo Gallardo – Juntos Hacemos Historia, federal deputy
Juan Carlos Machinena – 
Octavio Pedroza – Sí por San Luis Potosí (Conciencia Popular)
Mónica Rangel Martínez – 
José Luis Romero – 

The candidates formally began their campaigns on Friday, March 5. Speaking in Tancanhuitz de Santos, Rangel Martínez noted that only two of ten women in the region have formal employment.

Ricardo Gallardo won with 36.9% of the vote. Octavio Pedroza (Sí por San Luis Potosí ) was second with 34.1%.

Sinaloa
Governor of Sinaloa – incumbent Quirino Ordaz Coppel 
Mario Zamora Gastélum , currently a Senator (2018-2024) of the LXIV Legislature
Sergio Torres Félix 
Rubén Zarazúa Rocha , academic

Rubén Zarazúa Rocha won with 57.6% of the vote.

Sonora
Governor of Sonora – incumbent Claudia Pavlovich Arellano 
Ricardo Bours Castelo , brother of former governor Eduardo Bours (2003-2009)
Alfonso Durazo (Juntos Haremos Historia por Sonora  , PRN party, former Secretary of Security and Civilian Protection and former private secretary for President Vicente Fox
David Galindo 
Ernesto Gándara Camou (″El Borrego″), Va por Sonora (former federal deputy (2012-2015) and former mayor of Hermosillo (2006-2009)
Rosario Robles Robles 
Carlos Zatarain 

The candidates formally began their campaigns on Friday, March 5. Durazo Montaño, Gándara Camou, and Bours Castelo spoke about women's rights.

Alfonso Durazo (Juntos Haremos Historia por Sonora ) won with 50.5% of the vote.

Tlaxcala
Governor of Tlaxcala – incumbent Marco Antonio Mena Rodríguez 
Lorena Cuéllar Cisneros Juntos Haremos Historia, currently a federal deputy and former municipal president of Tlaxcala City

Lorena Cuéllar Cisneros (Juntos Haremos Historia won with 50.1% of the vote.

Zacatecas
Governor of Zacatecas – incumbent Alejandro Tello Cristerna 
Claudia Anaya Mota Va por México She kicked off her official campaign on March 7, 2021, criticizing the federal government's weak response to 11 femicides per day and the COVID-19 pandemic.
David Monreal Ávila Juntos Haremos Historia, current federal senator and former municipal president of Fresnillo (2007-2010)
Ana María Romo Fonseca
María Guadalupe Medina Padilla
Fernanda Salomé Perera Trejo
Miriam García Zamora
Flavio Campos Viramontes (Para Desarrollar Zacatecas)
Javier Valadez Becerra (Partido del Pueblo)
Bibiana Lizardo (Movimiento Dignidad)

David Monreal Ávila (Juntos Haremos Historia won with 48.6% of the vote.

Absentee voting
Mexican citizens from eleven states who live overseas can vote electronically. Most of the elections are for governor, but those from Mexico City and Guerrero will be able to vote for Diputado Migrante and people from Jalisco can vote for Diputado por Representación de Proporcional.

Social media
Even before the campaigns officially began on March 5, gubernatorial candidates had spent more than MXN $2 million on Facebook. Candidates of  led the way: Clara Luz Flores, Nuevo León ($765,235); María del Pilar Ávila, Baja California ($432,766); and Celia Maya, Querétaro ($415,303). Juan Carlos Loera, Chihuahua, and Alfonso Durazo, Sonora, have also spent more than $200,000 each.

Organized crime and politics
Several different criminal gangs implicated in drug trafficking, human trafficking, and fuel theft have a great deal of political influence in some states. The Sinaloa Cartel exercises considerable control in the northwest while the Jalisco New Generation Cartel′s (CJNG) influence is in the west including Michoacan and Guerrero. The Gulf Cartel and Los Zetas are powerful in the northeast.

In the past, drug cartels have influenced campaigns by supporting candidates and even running some of their own member or sympathizers as candidates for office such as Lucero Sánchez López, former federal deputy from Sinaloa who was also Joaquín "El Chapo" Guzmán′s lover. Election-related violence is of particular concern in Michoacan, not only because of the aforementioned drug cartels but also because of armed community police who often act as vigilantes.

See also

2021 in Mexican politics and government
2021 Mexican legislative election
2021 Mexican local elections
List of elections in 2021
List of political parties in Mexico

References

External links
Elección Federal y elecciones locales: INE, Instituto Nacional Electoral (in Spanish)

Elections in Mexico
Gubernatorial elections in Mexico
Elections in Mexico by state
Politics of Mexico
2021 elections in Mexico